Carl Milde may refer to:

 Carl Julius Milde (1803–1875), German painter, curator and art restorer
 Carl August Julius Milde (1824–1871), German bryologist and pteridologist